Humbach may refer to:

 Humbach (Ilm), a river of Thuringia, Germany, tributary of the Ilm
 Humbach (Schwarzbach), a river of Thuringia, Germany, tributary of the Schwarzbach